Friedrich Wolf (23 December 1888 – 5 October 1953) was a German doctor and politically-engaged writer. From 1949 to 1951, he served as East Germany's first ambassador to Poland.

Life
Wolf was born in Neuwied, Rhine Province, the son of a Jewish merchant.

From 1907 to 1912, he studied medicine, philosophy and art history in Munich, Tübingen, Bonn and Berlin and became a doctor in 1913. In 1914, he worked first as a ship's doctor on the route between Canada, Greenland and the United States and in the same year became a field doctor on the Western Front during World War I, an experience that made him a strong opponent of war. In 1917, he published his first prose pieces.

In 1918, he became a member of the workers' council in Dresden and joined the Independent Social Democratic Party of Germany. After the war, he worked as a doctor in Remscheid and Hechingen, where he focused on care for common people and prescribed treatment using naturopathic medicine. In 1923 and 1925, his sons Markus and Konrad were born. After 1928 he became a member of the Communist Party and the Association of Proletarian-Revolutionary Authors. In 1929, his play "Cyankali" sparked a debate about abortion and he was briefly arrested and charged for performing abortions.

In early 1932, he founded the Spieltrupp Südwest in Stuttgart, a communist agitprop group of lay actors that created controversial pieces about current topics.

After the Nazis came to power, Wolf emigrated with his family to Moscow. In 1938 he made his way to Spain to work as a doctor in the International Brigades. However, he was arrested in France and interned in a concentration camp, Camp Vernet. In 1941, he gained Soviet citizenship and returned to Moscow, where he became a founder of the National Committee for a Free Germany (NKFD).

In 1945, he returned to Germany and was active in literary and cultural-political issues. From 1949 to 1951, he was the first ambassador of East Germany to Poland. On 5 October 1953, he died in his personal office in East Berlin. The Land Forces of the National People's Army named the 1st Motor Rifle Division's 1st Panzer Regiment in his honour.

Works

Mohammed (1917, drama)
"Langemarck" (1917, story)
Das bist du (1919, drama)
Der Unbedingte (1919, drama)
Die Schwarze Sonne (1921, drama)
Tamar (1922, drama)
Die Schrankkomödie (1923, drama)
Der Arme Konrad (1923, drama)
Das Heldenepos des alten Bundes  (1924)
Kreatur (1925, novel)
Kolonne Hund (1926, drama)
Äther (1926)
Die Natur als Arzt und Helfer (1927)
Koritke (1927, drama)
"Der Kampf im Kohlenpott" (1927, novella)
Cyankali (1929, drama)
Die Matrosen von Cattaro (1930, drama)
Tai Yang erwacht (1930, drama)
Professor Mamlock (1933, drama)
Floridsdorf (1934, drama)
Das trojanische Pferd (1935, drama)
Chin Up, Anna! (1935, short story)
Zwei an der Grenze (1938, novel)
Beaumarchais (1940, drama)
"Der Russenpelz" (1942, novella)
Heimkehr der Söhne (1944, novel)
Dr. Lilli Wanner (1944, drama)
Was der Mensch säet (1945, drama)
Die letzte Probe (1946, drama)
Märchen für große und kleine Kinder (1946)
Wie Tiere des Waldes (1947, drama)
The Council of the Gods (Der Rat der Götter) (1949, filmscript)
Bürgermeister Anna (1949, comedy)
Menetekel (1952, novel)
Thomas Müntzer (1952, drama, film expose)

Awards and decorations
 Order of the Red Star (1943)
 National Prize of East Germany
2nd class for Professor Mamlock (1949)
1st Class for The Council of the Gods (1950)

Sources 
 Hoffmann, Stefan Gotthelf: Der Rest ist Schweigen! Erdachte Gespräche mit Friedrich Wolf (1888–1953). Edition Schwarzdruck, Gransee 2013, .
 Müller, Henning: Friedrich Wolf : 1888–1953. Deutscher Jude, Schriftsteller, Sozialist. (Jüdische Miniaturen; Bd. 78) Hentrich & Hentrich, Berlin 2009, .
 Müller, Reinhard: Was ist ein Mensch? Aus der Moskauer Kaderakte Friedrich Wolfs. In: Einspruch. Schriftenreihe der Friedrich-Wolf-Gesellschaft. Exil in der Sowjetunion. Herausgegeben von Hermann Haarmann und Christoph Hesse. Marburg 2010, p. 23–52.

References

1888 births
1953 deaths
People from Neuwied
People from the Rhine Province
German medical writers
Jewish German politicians
Jewish socialists
Independent Social Democratic Party politicians
Communist Party of Germany politicians
Socialist Unity Party of Germany politicians
Ambassadors of East Germany to Poland
German military doctors
German Army personnel of World War I
International Brigades personnel
Jewish refugees from Nazi Germany in the Soviet Union
National Committee for a Free Germany members
University of Bonn alumni
Recipients of the National Prize of East Germany
German male novelists
German male dramatists and playwrights
20th-century German novelists
20th-century German dramatists and playwrights
Prisoners and detainees of France